Manuel Poggiali (born 14 February 1983) is a Sammarinese Grand Prix motorcycle road racing World Champion. He was the 2001 125cc World Champion, and the 2003 250cc World Champion. He scored 12 race wins, 11 pole positions, and 35 podium finishes.

Career
Poggiali began racing Minibikes in 1994, and made his first Grand Prix starts in 1998, also winning the Italian 125cc Championship that year. He went into the 125cc World Championship full-time in 1999, and showed promise over the next two years, scoring a first podium at Assen in 2000. In 2001 he improved to win the title on a Gilera. He remained in the class in 2002, scoring 7 podiums in the first 8 races but failing to defend his title, losing out to Arnaud Vincent.

For 2003 he moved up to 250s, and followed Freddie Spencer and Tetsuya Harada in winning the title at his first attempt, including victories in the season's first two races. He had a disappointing 2004 however, finishing only 9th overall with just three podium results.

For 2005 he returned to 125s, again looking like a shadow of his former self, failing to take a single podium. In 2006 he raced in the 250cc class for the KTM team, but they did not renew his contract for 2007. Although he received some offers from 125cc, 250cc, and Superbike teams, he decided to refuse the offers and take a sabbatical, hoping to get better offers in 2008. He made his return to racing after announcing that he would ride for Campetella Racing alongside Fabrizio Lai. He decided to retire midseason after losing enthusiasm.

He is also a footballer, he played some matches over the last years for Pennarossa, a football club of San Marino.
For 2013 he returned to motorcycle racing and rode in the Italian Superbike Championship for Scuderia Corse Team Grandi aboard a Ducati 1199 Panigale. He finished the season in 14th overall with a second-place finish in the penultimate race of the year at Mugello being his best finish. For 2014 he signed to ride for the Barni Racing Team aboard a Ducati 1199 Panigale in the CIV Superbike Championship and finished 11th overall.

Career statistics

Grand Prix motorcycle racing

Races by year
(key) (Races in bold indicate pole position; races in italics indicate fastest lap)

References

External links

 manuelpoggiali.com Official website
 poggiali.com Official fan club
 Manuel Poggiali at www.f1network.net

Sammarinese motorcycle racers
250cc World Championship riders
125cc World Championship riders
1983 births
Living people
250cc World Riders' Champions
125cc World Riders' Champions